Ira Progoff (August 2, 1921 – January 1, 1998) was an American psychotherapist, best known for his development of the Intensive Journal Method while at Drew University. His main interest was in depth psychology and particularly the humanistic adaptation of Jungian ideas to the lives of ordinary people. He founded Dialogue House in New York City to help promote this method.

Progoff began exploring psychological methods for creativity and spiritual experience in their social applications in the early 1950s. His doctoral dissertation in the field of the social history of ideas at the New School was on the work of C.G. Jung. In 1953, the dissertation was published in hardcover by the Julian Press as Jung's Psychology and its Social Meaning. Later editions were published by the Grove Press, Anchor/Doubleday, and Dialogue House. After receiving his doctorate, Progoff was awarded a Bollingen fellowship, and studied privately with Jung in Switzerland.

This work led to a reconstruction of depth psychology in terms of the later work of Freud, Adler, Jung, and Rank in The Death and Rebirth of Psychology and a first statement of Holistic Depth Psychology in Depth Psychology and Modern Man. In 1963, Progoff put forward the method of Psyche-Evoking in The Symbolic and the Real.

In 1966, Progoff drew from the principles described in these books to introduce the Intensive Journal method of personal development, the innovation for which he is most remembered. This is a nonanalytic, integrative system for evoking and interrelating the contents of an individual life. Progoff wrote two books describing the method: At a Journal Workshop and The Practice of Process Meditation. The system's popularity spread rapidly.

As the public use of the method increased, the National Intensive Journal Program was formed in 1977. It supplied materials and leaders for the conduct of Intensive Journal workshops in the United States and other countries in cooperation with local sponsoring organizations.

The Intensive Journal education program was expanded upon in 1983 with the publication of Life-Study, which described the application of the Intensive Journal process in experiencing the lives of significant persons from past generations.

Events

 Served in United States Army during World War II era
 Received PhD in psychology from New School for Social Research in New York City
 1952, 1953, 1955: Studied with Carl Jung in Switzerland as a Bollingen Fellow
 1959-1971: Depth psychologist and Director of the Institute for Research in Depth Psychology at Drew University
 1975: At a Journal Workshop first published, popularizing basics of Intensive Journal Method
 1998: Died of progressive supranuclear palsy in January 1998.

Selected works 
This is a partial, chronological list of Progoff's books:

See also

Analytical psychology
Depth psychology
Intensive Journal Method

References

External links
 Dialogue House biography of Progoff 
 ABC del Diario Intensivo, en castellano

1921 births
1998 deaths
20th-century American psychologists
American psychotherapists
The New School alumni
Drew University faculty
Jungian psychologists